"Soup for One" is a song performed by the band Chic. The song is written in A minor and is featured on the soundtrack album Soup for One. The song went to No. 14 on the Billboard Soul singles chart and No. 80 on the Hot 100.

Samples
In 2000, it was sampled by French house duo Modjo for their single "Lady (Hear Me Tonight)". In live performances, Chic usually plays "Soup for One" in a medley with "Lady".

Track listings
US Mirage 7", WTG 4032 (1982)
A. "Soup for One" (edit) - 3:08
B. "Burn Hard" (edit) - 3:39

US Mirage 12", DM 4827 (1982)
A. "Soup for One" (extended) - 7:58
B. "Burn Hard" (album version) - 5:12

References

External links
Discogs entry

1982 singles
Chic (band) songs
Song recordings produced by Nile Rodgers
Songs written by Nile Rodgers
Songs written by Bernard Edwards
Song recordings produced by Bernard Edwards
1982 songs
Mirage Records singles